Luis Felipe Areta Sampériz (born 28 March 1942 in San Sebastián, Guipúzcoa) is a retired Spanish triple jumper.

His personal best jump was 16.36 metres, achieved in July 1968 in Estocolmo. He had a better indoor mark with 16.47 metres, achieved at the 1968 European Indoor Games in Madrid. Both marks are former Spanish records.

He is a numerary of Opus Dei from October 1959. Ordained priest in 1980, lives in Bilbao.

International competitions

References

External links
 

1942 births
Living people
Sportspeople from San Sebastián
Spanish male long jumpers
Spanish male triple jumpers
Athletes from the Basque Country (autonomous community)
Olympic athletes of Spain
Athletes (track and field) at the 1960 Summer Olympics
Athletes (track and field) at the 1964 Summer Olympics
Athletes (track and field) at the 1968 Summer Olympics
Opus Dei members
Universiade medalists in athletics (track and field)
Mediterranean Games gold medalists for Spain
Mediterranean Games medalists in athletics
Athletes (track and field) at the 1963 Mediterranean Games
Athletes (track and field) at the 1967 Mediterranean Games
Universiade bronze medalists for Spain
Medalists at the 1963 Summer Universiade
20th-century Spanish people